Frances Riddle (born in Houston) is an American-born literary translator, specializing in the translation of contemporary Latin American literature into English.

She has a BA in Spanish Language and Literature from Louisiana State University and an MA in Translation Studies from the University of Buenos Aires. To date, she has translated more than a dozen novels for leading translation houses such as New Directions Publishing, Dalkey Archive Press and Charco Press. Originally from Houston, Texas, she lives in Buenos Aires, Argentina.

In April 2022, Riddle's translation of Claudia Piñeiro's novel Elena Knows was shortlisted for the International Booker Prize.

Selected translations
 A Simple Story: The Last Malambo by Leila Guerriero
 Slum Virgin by Gabriela Cabezón Cámara
 Bodies of Summer by Martín Felipe Castagnet
 The German Room by Carla Maliandi
 The Abandoned House by Mario Levrero
 The Life and Deaths of Ethel Jurado by Gregorio Casamayor
 Cockfight by María Fernanda Ampuero
 Not One Less by María Pía López
 Plebian Prose by Néstor Perlongher
 Theatre of War by Andrea Jeftanovic
 Elena Knows by Claudia Piñeiro
 Violeta by Isabel Allende

References

21st-century translators
Argentine translators
Living people
Spanish–English translators
University of Buenos Aires alumni
Year of birth missing (living people)